Brunhilde Peak is a rock peak between the upper part of Donner Valley and Sykes Glacier in the Asgard Range, Victoria Land. Flat Spur descends northeast from the peak between the north and south branches of Sykes Glacier. Both features were named by the New Zealand Antarctic Place-Names Committee. The peak itself is named after Brunhilde, one in a group of names in the range derived from Norse mythology. Flat Spur is simply named descriptively.

References

Mountains of the Asgard Range
McMurdo Dry Valleys